The Sam Houston Bearkats men's basketball team, represents Sam Houston State University in Huntsville, Texas, United States.  The Bearkats are one of four programs, all from Texas, that left the Southland Conference on July 1, 2021 to join the Western Athletic Conference (WAC). Sam Houston had previously been a member of the Southland Conference since the 1987–88 season. The Bearkats have played home games at Johnson Coliseum, a 5,529 seat indoor arena, since 1976, when it was then called University Coliseum. They are currently led by head coach Jason Hooten.

History
Sam Houston has a prestigious history in regards to men's basketball. The Bearkats have fielded a basketball team since 1917, excluding the 1942–43 and 1943–44 basketball seasons. Basketball was not played these years because World War II had decimated male enrollment at Sam Houston. Success began early as Sam Houston went 43–11 during its first five years, including an unblemished 24–0 record during its first three.

During the 21st century, Sam Houston's men's basketball program boasts the second-winningest program in Texas Division I, only behind Texas. The Bearkats are also the winningest program in the Southland Conference during the last decade.

Postseason appearances

NCAA Division I Tournament
The Bearkats have appeared in two NCAA Division I Tournaments. Their combined record is 0–2.

NIT results
The Bearkats have appeared in two National Invitation Tournament. Their combined record is 1–1.

CIT results
The Bearkats have appeared in the CollegeInsider.com Postseason Tournament (CIT) four times. Their combined record is 4–4.

NCAA Division II Tournament
The Bearkats have appeared in one NCAA Division II tournament. Their record is 0–2.

NAIA Tournament
The Bearkats have appeared in one NAIA tournament. Their record is 1–1.

References

External links
Website